Kenya competed at the 2012 Summer Olympics in London, from 27 July to 12 August 2012. This was the nation's thirteenth appearance at the Olympics, they did not participate in the 1976 Summer Olympics in Montreal and the 1980 Summer Olympics in Moscow because of the African and United States boycott.

National Olympic Committee Kenya (NOCK) sent a total of 47 athletes, 27 men and 20 women, competed in athletics (specifically in the middle-distance events and marathon), boxing, swimming and weightlifting. The Kenyan team featured four past Olympic champions: middle-distance runners Pamela Jelimo and Asbel Kiprop and steeplechase runners Brimin Kipruto and Ezekiel Kemboi. Among these champions, only Kemboi managed to recapture his gold medal from Athens, after winning the men's steeplechase event. Kenya's top swimmer Jason Dunford, who specialized in the butterfly and freestyle events, became the nation's first male flag bearer at the opening ceremony since 2000.

Kenya left London with a total of 11 medals (2 gold, 4 silver, and 5 bronze), being the most successful African country in these Olympic games based on the overall medal standings. Two more medals were redistributed to Kenyan athletes after the games ended due to doping cases. All of these medals were awarded to the track and field athletes. Middle-distance runner and world champion David Rudisha became the first athlete to set a world record on the track in London, as he won the gold medal in the men's 800 m.

Medalists

Athletics

Kenyan athletes have so far achieved qualifying standards in the following athletics events (up to a maximum of 3 athletes in each event at the 'A' Standard, and 1 at the 'B' Standard):

Men
Track & road events

Field events

Women
Track & road events

Boxing

Kenya has qualified boxers for the following events

Men

Women

Swimming

Kenyan swimmers have so far achieved qualifying standards in the following events (up to a maximum of 2 swimmers in each event at the Olympic Qualifying Time (OQT), and 1 at the Olympic Selection Time (OST)):

Men

Weightlifting

Kenya has qualified 1 athlete.

References

External links

 
 

Nations at the 2012 Summer Olympics
2012
Olympics